NBIR (Ningbo Intercity Railway.) also known as Ningbo Suburban Railway is a commuter rail service that connects urban Ningbo with outlying cities and counties beyond the reach of the city's Ningbo Rail Transit network.  The "S"-numbered suburban rail lines are managed by the Ningbo Intercity Railway CO.,Ltd., an subsidiary of CR Shanghai, part of the national railway company and partially owned by Ningbo Rail Transit Co.,Ltd., the municipal company that operates the metro.

There are 1 suburban railway line currently in operation: Ningbo–Yuyao or Yongyu (S1).

In operation

See also

 Ningbo Rail Transit

References

Railway lines in China
Rail transport in Zhejiang